The Three Shades (Les Trois Ombres) is a sculptural group produced in plaster by Auguste Rodin in 1886 for his The Gates of Hell. He made several individual studies for the Shades before finally deciding to put them together as three identical figures gathered around a central point. The heads hang low so that the neck and shoulders form an almost-horizontal plane. They were to be placed above the gates looking down on the viewer.

Casts
It was later cast in bronze in several editions, with such casts now in the Musée Rodin in Paris, the Cantor Sculpture Garden at Stanford University, in the California Palace of the Legion of Honor, the Rodin Museum in Philadelphia and the Museo Soumaya in Mexico. An autograph plaster copy dating to 1917 is also in the Musée d'arts de Nantes.

See also
List of sculptures by Auguste Rodin

References

External links

Sculptures by Auguste Rodin
Nude sculptures
Plaster sculptures
Bronze sculptures
1886 sculptures
Sculptures of the Museo Soumaya
Sculptures of the Musée Rodin
Bronze sculptures in Mexico
Statues in Mexico City
Statues in France
Statues in California
Statues in Pennsylvania